Cryptotermes ceylonicus, is a species of dry wood termite of the genus Cryptotermes. It is found in Sri Lanka. It is found in living wood, and other man-made wooden constructions. They possess teeth-less mandibles.

References

External links

Termites
Insects described in 1962
Invertebrates of Sri Lanka